Jean Tamini (9 December 1919 – 13 March 1993) was a Swiss football forward who played for Switzerland in the 1950 FIFA World Cup. He also played for FC Lyon, AS Saint-Étienne, and Servette FC.

References

External links
FIFA profile

1919 births
1993 deaths
Swiss men's footballers
Swiss expatriate footballers
Switzerland international footballers
Association football forwards
Expatriate footballers in France
AS Saint-Étienne players
Servette FC players
1950 FIFA World Cup players
FC Lyon players